Ebenezer Knowlton (December 6, 1815 – September 10, 1874) was a U.S. Representative from Maine, and Free Will Baptist minister.

Biography
Born in Pittsfield, New Hampshire, Knowlton moved with his parents to South Montville, Maine, in 1825. He attended the China and Waterville Academies in Maine. He studied theology and entered the ministry as a Free Will Baptist.

Career
Knowlton served as a member of the Maine House of Representatives from 1844 to 1850, and served as speaker in 1846. Knowlton was elected as an Opposition Party (a party transitioning between the Whigs and Republicans) candidate to the Thirty-fourth Congress from March 4, 1855 to March 3, 1857. He became an early member of the Republican Party and was a lifelong supporter of abolitionism and the temperance movement.

Knowlton served as trustee of Bates College in Lewiston, Maine. Knowlton also served as a trustee of Colby College and Maine Central Institute, and after the Civil War he worked for the Freedmen's Bureau in Beaufort, South Carolina.

He was a corporator of the Morning Star, a Free Will Baptist newspaper, and was president of the Foreign Missions Board.  Knowlton continued his ministerial duties until his death.

Death
Knowlton died in South Montville, Maine on September 10, 1874, and is interred in the South Montville City Cemetery.

See also
Ebenezer Knowlton House

References

External links
 
 
 Nathan Franklin Carter, The Native Ministry of New Hampshire, (1906)

1815 births
1874 deaths
19th-century American politicians
19th-century Baptist ministers from the United States
Activists from New Hampshire
American abolitionists
American temperance activists
Baptist abolitionists
Bates College people
Free Will Baptists
Republican Party members of the Maine House of Representatives
Opposition Party members of the United States House of Representatives from Maine
People from Montville, Maine
People from Pittsfield, New Hampshire
South Carolina Republicans
Speakers of the Maine House of Representatives
Members of the United States House of Representatives from Maine